Worship at Red Rocks is the second live album by John Tesh, released in 2004. The album was recorded live at the Red Rocks Amphitheatre, with the exception of the last two bonus studio tracks.

Track listing

Personnel 
 John Tesh – lead vocals, grand piano, synthesizers
 Michael Ruff – keyboards, organ
 Gannin Arnold – acoustic guitar, electric guitars
 Stan Sinclair – acoustic guitar 
 Tim Landers – bass guitar, music director 
 Neal Wilkinson – drums
 James Sitterly – violin 
 Christine Miller – backing vocals 
 Christina Rasch – backing vocals 

Choir
 Kathleen Benton, Amy Buckner, Galen Burson, Kathryn Dawson, Jude Del Hierro, Paul Dunne, Tom Ewing, Linda Galambos, Gib Gerard, Steve Grant, Rob Haasdyk, Michael Jordon, Jason King, Dave LeMieux, Lesslye Mason, Robin Miller, Esther Pulley, Edna Robinson, Ginny Romine, Diane Rusaw, Angie Sanders, Rhoda Shultz and Nathan Stuart

Production 
 Connie Sellecca – executive producer 
 John Tesh – executive producer, producer, mixing 
 Christina Rasch – co-producer 
 David Habbeger – recording 
 Ted Jensen – mastering at Sterling Sound (New York, NY)
 Roswell Jones – production manager, stage manager 
 Richard McIntosh – production manager 

All track information and credits were taken from the CD liner notes.

References

External links
John Tesh Official Site
Red Rocks Official Site

John Tesh albums
2004 live albums
Albums recorded at Red Rocks Amphitheatre